Lyes Ould Ammar (born July 6, 1983 in Algiers) is an Algerian international volleyball player.

Club information

Current club :  Arago Séte Volleyball

Debut club:  MC Alger

See also 
Algeria men's national volleyball team

References

1983 births
Living people
Algerian men's volleyball players
Algerian expatriates in France
Volleyball players from Algiers
21st-century Algerian people